Megan LeeAnn Turney (born March 12, 1987) is an American streamer, internet personality, cosplayer, glamour model, and vlogger. She became an internet personality through her hosting work, formerly with SourceFed and Rooster Teeth's The Know. She also maintains a personal YouTube channel where she posts vlogs and Let's Play videos and live streams. In addition to her work with online media, Turney also cosplays at various conventions, such as Comic-Con.

Cosplay modeling
Through a friend's invitation to Ushicon 1, Turney was introduced to cosplaying and anime conventions in 2002. Turney's first cosplay was of Sailor Heavy Metal Papillon from the anime, Sailor Moon. On her first cosplay, Turney recalled, "I failed terribly. I couldn’t make half the costume, it was incredibly difficult, but I was as happy as a clam." Since then, Turney became recognized for her cosplaying and was able to generate a following large enough to turn cosplaying into her full-time career. The Vancouver Sun wrote that "Turney is an internet mainstay. She has her own YouTube channel and her Patreon fan site is an earner." When she began to receive cover in online publications, Turney's Faye Valentine, Princess Leia, and Psycho cosplays were particularly recognized. Turney's notability as a cosplayer led her to appear on the Syfy series Heroes of Cosplay and a commercial for Guild Wars 2. She hosted a cosplay contest in 2013 at SXSW. Turney was also a special guest at the 2016 edition of Fan Expo Vancouver.

Her cosplaying has been noted by various media publications to be racy and erotic. Turney's online content majorly includes images of her cosplaying and modeling, with Inquisitr writing that "she has a tendency to upload photos that push the boundaries of Instagram's community guidelines regarding nudity." On sexuality in cosplay, Turney has stated, "I think there is an element of sexuality for cosplay and for some people there is no sexuality whatsoever. I think it is all about how you approach it. I think that is true of any community really." Turney also maintains that there is more work involved in her cosplaying than showing off her body, such as costume designing, and stated "I think some people just go, 'She [fellow cosplayer Jessica Nigri] has boobs, that's why she's popular.' But that's not really the case." In January 2015, Playboy ranked Turney at number 10 on its "25 Hottest YouTube Stars" listing. In April 2015, FHM placed Turney at number 20 on its annual "100 Sexiest Women in the World" list.

Having worked with various photographers, Turney also has experience modeling outside of cosplay. In June 2015, Playboy conducted a photoshoot with Turney.

One of her cosplays was of her boyfriend Gavin's character from Rooster Teeth's show X-Ray and Vav, with Ashley Jenkins joining her as X-Ray at RTX 2014. Ray and Gavin themselves had attended the Achievement Hunter panel of the previous year's RTX in costume as the duo, which had originally started out as an intro flub on Gavin's part for a Halo 4 achievement guide.

Gallery

Online media career

Career beginnings and SourceFed (2012–2014)
Turney registered her YouTube channel in November 2009 but began posting vlogs in 2012. During the early years of her online media career, Turney hosted event coverage for deviantART and appeared as a featured host on CraveOnline's TechKnow show. In July 2012, Turney would break through as an online media host, making her debut appearance on SourceFed, alongside Steve Zaragoza, in which the two discussed Star Wars, Comic-Con, and cosplaying. Later that year Turney was alongside Elliott Morgan and Philip DeFranco during SourceFed's videos for YouTube's "Election Hub." In February 2013, Turney and her SourceFed co-hosts won an Audience Choice Streamy Award for Series of the Year. Along with being a co-host of the channel, Turney was also a writer for the SourceFed website. Turney would remain a host of the channel, as well as its Nerd spinoff, until April 2014, when she announced she would be leaving SourceFed.

During her time with SourceFed, Turney appeared as a host of other series including the AMA's On Demand, as well as Nerdist News. Additionally, in August 2013, Turney discussed Hollywood portrayals about life on Mars, alongside Bobak Ferdowsi, Matt Mira, and Kevin Lieber.

Work with Rooster Teeth (2014–2016)
After departing from SourceFed, Turney was announced as a new host for Rooster Teeth's news channel, The Know, on May 30, 2014. On joining Rooster Teeth, Turney claimed, "They have been pioneers in the industry for many years, and their level of originality and just plain fun in their content is unmatched in the space." On June 1, 2014, Turney made her first appearance on The Know. In July 2014, Rooster Teeth distributed the music video for "Did I Say That Out Loud?" by Barenaked Ladies, in which Turney portrays the exasperated girlfriend of Gavin Free's character. In August 2014, Turney began co-hosting The Know It All: Leaderboard, a collaborative series between Rooster Teeth and The Daily Dot. Turney also voiced Neon Katt in the animated series RWBY, and was a regular host on The Patch, Rooster Teeth's weekly gaming podcast. On June 27, 2016, Turney announced that she had left Rooster Teeth on good terms.

Twitch streaming and gaming (2016–present)
In October 2014, Turney was involved in a controversy when live streaming video website Twitch updated its rules of conduct telling users to not shoot videos in "lingerie, swimsuits, pasties, and undergarments". Some news websites reported that Turney was the first user banned for violating the updated rules of conduct. Turney clarified on Twitter, stating, "Dear everyone writing articles saying I was banned from Twitch, I wasn't. I've never been banned. I was told to change my picture," adding "while we're on the subject I've never done any 'sexy broadcasts'. I've never even streamed from that account." Additionally, Turney also provided her opinion that the rule was not unfair to women, but just unfair in general, stating, "If someone has a big push-up bra and a low-cut shirt while they play [League of Legends] or a guy streams shirtless, who cares?"

In June 2016, Turney began streaming on Twitch. In the years since leaving SourceFed and Rooster Teeth, Turney has continued to upload video game commentaries and streams, as well as cosplay-related vlogs on her personal YouTube channel. 

In April 2019, Turney signed with talent agency Abrams Artists, joining its gaming roster. In June 2020, Turney moved from Abrams to TalentX Gaming, where she is currently represented. In October, she participated in a Dead by Daylight tournament hosted by Twitch Rivals.

Turney currently streams Dead by Daylight regularly, along with a variety of other games, and celebrated 5 years of Twitch partnership in June 2021. Turney's YouTube channel also became primarily used as a selection of highlights from her Twitch streams.

OnlyFans (2020–present)
In March 2020, Turney created an OnlyFans account to supplement her Patreon account. At the time, Patreon was her primary venue for releasing her modeling work while OnlyFans was there primarily to share older photosets that were no longer available on Patreon, but in October 2020, Turney announced on her Twitter that she was moving all of her content to OnlyFans and that the site would be her new primary content hub. After releasing her book of topless photos on her personal website, she began creating boudoir content full time on her OnlyFans. Turney still releases Cosplay photosets on her OnlyFans, but most of her content is boudoir photography.

Personal life
Turney has openly spoken about her bisexuality with her audience. In a video interview with the YouTube channel VlogBrothers, she further discussed being bisexual, and spoke about how she was teased for her sexual orientation. At VidCon 2013, Turney spoke during the convention's "Being LGBT on YouTube" panel.

She has been in a relationship with Gavin Free since 2013.

Home invasion
On January 26, 2018, a man armed with a handgun broke into Turney's and Free's home, breaking a window to enter and firing one round as he did. Turney and Free hid in a closet and called police. When the man could not find the couple, he left but was confronted by police outside. The suspect fired one shot and police returned fire; when officers approached the suspect's vehicle, they found him dead. Turney and Free were physically unharmed during the incident. It has been assessed the suspect was a fan who had developed an obsession with Turney, and he was attempting to cause harm to Free, against whom he felt resentment. Turney ceased updating her YouTube channel for nearly half a year following the incident, citing concern for her safety in sharing her life with an audience.

Filmography

Web series

Film

Music video

References

External links

 
 

1987 births
20th-century American LGBT people
21st-century American actresses
21st-century American LGBT people
Actresses from Austin, Texas
American bloggers
American YouTubers
American podcasters
American voice actresses
American women bloggers
American women podcasters
Bisexual actresses
Cosplayers
Female models from Texas
Gaming YouTubers
Glamour models
American LGBT entertainers
LGBT models
LGBT people from Texas
LGBT YouTubers
Living people
OnlyFans creators
Rooster Teeth people
Screenwriters from Texas
SourceFed people
Twitch (service) streamers
Video game commentators
Women video bloggers
YouTubers from Texas
YouTube vloggers